Kimarite is the technique used in sumo by a rikishi (wrestler) to win a match. It is officially decided or announced by the gyōji (referee) at the end of the match, though judges can modify this decision. The records of kimarite are then kept for statistical purposes.

The Japan Sumo Association (JSA) have officially recognized 82 such techniques since 2001, with five also recognized as winning non-techniques. However, only about a dozen of these are frequently and regularly used by rikishi.

A sumo match can still be won even without a kimarite, by the virtue of disqualification due to a kinjite (foul), such as striking with closed fist.

Basic 

The basic techniques are some of the most common winning techniques in sumo, with the exception of abisetaoshi.

Abisetaoshi 

 is a rarely used basic kimarite that pushes down the opponent into the ground back-first by leaning forward while grappling.

Oshidashi 

 is a basic kimarite that requires pushing the opponent out of the ring using the arms, without holding their mawashi (belt) nor extending the arms.

Oshitaoshi 

 is similar to an oshidashi, except that the opponent falls down (as opposed to standing).

Tsukidashi 

 is a basic kimarite that uses a single or a series of hand thrusts to force the opponent out of the ring.

Tsukitaoshi 

 is similar to a tsukidashi, except that the opponent falls down (as opposed to standing).

Yorikiri 

 is a basic kimarite where the rikishi maintains physical contact on their opponent, usually through a grip on their mawashi, and continuously forcing them out of the ring.

Yoritaoshi 

 is similar to a yorikiri, except that the opponent falls down out of the ring as a result (as opposed to standing), effectively crushing them out.

Leg tripping 

Leg tripping techniques are kimarite where the rikishi wins the match by tripping or grabbing their opponent's leg out of the ring.

Ashitori

 is a kimarite where the rikishi grabs one of their opponent's leg, resulting in a loss of balance, enabling the rikishi to force them out of the ring.

Chongake

 is a kimarite where the rikishi trips their opponent through one of their heel by using their own heel, thereby resulting in a loss of balance and forcing their opponent to fall down back-first.

Kawazugake
 is a kimarite where the rikishi wraps their leg around the opponent's leg of the opposite side and trips him backwards while grasping onto his upper body.

Kekaeshi
Kekaeshi (蹴返し, "minor inner foot sweep") is a kimarite which involves kicking the inside of the opponent's foot. This is usually accompanied by a quick pull that causes the opponent to lose balance and fall.

Ketaguri
Ketaguri (蹴手繰り, "pulling inside ankle sweep") is a kimarite in which, directly after the tachi-ai, the attacker kicks the opponent's legs to the outside and thrusts or twists him down to the dohyō.

Kirikaeshi
Kirikaeshi (切り返し, "twisting backward knee trip") is a kimarite in which the attacker places his leg behind the knee of the opponent, and while twisting the opponent sideways and backwards, sweeps him over the attacker's leg and throws him down.

Komatasukui
Komatasukui (小股掬い, "over thigh scooping body drop") is a kimarite in which an opponent responds to being thrown and puts his leg out forward to balance himself, grabbing the underside of the thigh and lifting it up, throwing the opponent down.

Kozumatori
Kozumatori (小褄取り, "ankle pick") is a kimarite in which an attacker lifts the opponent's ankle from the front, causing them to fall.

Mitokorozeme

Mitokorozeme (三所攻め, "triple attack force out") is a triple attack. Wrapping one leg around the opponent's (inside leg trip), grabbing the other leg behind the thigh, and thrusting the head into the opponent's chest, the attacker pushes him up and off the surface, then throwing him down on his back.

This is a very rare technique, first used in the modern era by Mainoumi Shūhei, who used it two or three times in the early 1990s (officially twice, on a third occasion his win was judged by most observers to be a mitokorozeme, but was officially judged an uchigake).

This technique was used in a victory by Ishiura against Nishikigi on Day 8 (Sunday, November 17, 2019) of the Fukuoka Basho (Sumo Tournament), for the first time in makuuchi since Mainoumi in 1993.

Nimaigeri
Nimaigeri (二枚蹴り, "ankle kicking twist down") is a kimarite in which the attacker kicks an off-balance opponent on the outside of their standing leg's foot, then throws him to the surface.

Ōmata
Ōmata (大股, "thigh scooping body drop") is a kimarite in which, when the opponent escapes from a komatsukui by extending the other foot, the attacker switches to lift the opponent's other off-balance foot and throws him down.

Sotogake
Sotogake (外掛, "outside leg trip") is a kimarite in which the attacker wraps his calf around the opponent's calf from the outside and drives him over backwards.

Former UFC light heavyweight champion Lyoto Machida, with a sumo background, has successfully used this multiple times in the course of his mixed martial arts career.

Sotokomata
Sotokomata (外小股, "over thigh scooping body drop") is a kimarite in which, directly after a nage or hikkake is avoided by the opponent, the attacker grabs the opponent's thigh from the outside, lifting it, and throwing them down on their back.

Susoharai
Susoharai (裾払い, rear foot sweep) is a kimarite in which, directly after a nage or hikkake is avoided by the opponent, an attacker drives the knee under the opponent's thigh and pulls them down to the surface.

Susotori
Susotori (裾取り, "toe pick") is a kimarite in which, directly after a nage is avoided by the opponent, an attacker grabs the ankle of the opponent and pulls them down to the surface.

Tsumatori
Tsumatori (褄取り, "rear toe pick") is a kimarite in which, as the opponent is losing their balance to the front (or is moving forward), the attacker grabs the leg and pulls it back, thereby ensuring the opponent falls to the surface.

Uchigake
Uchigake (内掛け, "inside leg trip") is performed by wrapping the calf around the opponent's calf from the inside and forcing him down on his back.

Watashikomi
Watashikomi (渡し込み, "thigh grabbing push down") is performed by grabbing the underside of the opponent's thigh or knee with one hand and pushing with the other arm, thereby forcing the opponent out or down.

Throwing
Throwing techniques are kimarite where the rikishi wins the match by throwing their opponent to the dohyō or out of the ring.

Ipponzeoi
Ipponzeoi (一本背負い, "one-armed shoulder throw") is a kimarite in which, while moving backwards to the side, the opponent is pulled past the attacker and out of the ring by grabbing and pulling their arm with both hands.

Kakenage
Kakenage (掛け投げ, "hooking inner thigh throw") is performed by lifting the opponent's thigh with one's leg, while grasping the opponent with both arms, and then throwing the off-balance opponent to the ground.

Koshinage
Koshinage (腰投げ, "hip throw") is performed by bending over and pulling the opponent over the attacker's hip, then throwing the opponent to the ground on their back.

Kotenage
Kotenage (小手投げ, "armlock throw") is a kimarite in which the attacker wraps their arm around the opponent's extended arm (差し手 - gripping arm), then throws the opponent to the ground without touching their mawashi. A common technique.

Kubinage
Kubinage (首投げ, "headlock throw") is performed by the attacker wrapping the opponent's head (or neck) in his arms, throwing him down.

Nichōnage
Nichōnage (二丁投げ, "body drop throw") is performed by extending the right (left) leg around the outside of the opponent's right (left) knee thereby sweeping both of his legs off the surface and throwing him down.

Shitatedashinage
Shitatedashinage (下手出し投げ, "pulling underarm throw") is performed when the attacker extends their arm under the opponent's arm to grab the opponent's mawashi while dragging the opponent forwards and/or to the side, throwing them to the ground.

Shitatenage
Shitatenage (下手投げ, "underarm throw") is a kimarite in which the attacker extends their arm under the opponent's arm to grab the opponent's mawashi and turns sideways, pulling the opponent down and throwing them to the ground.

Sukuinage
Sukuinage (掬い投げ, "beltless arm throw") is performed by the attacker extending their arm under the opponent's armpit and across their back while turning sideways, forcing the opponent forward and throwing him to the ground without touching the mawashi (beltless arm throw).

Tsukaminage
Tsukaminage (つかみ投げ, "lifting throw") is a technique where the attacker grabs the opponent's mawashi and lifts his body off the surface, pulling them into the air past the attacker and throwing them down.

Uwatedashinage
Uwatedashinage (上手出し投げ, "pulling overarm throw") is executed when the attacker extends their arm over the opponent's arm/back to grab the opponent's mawashi while pulling them forwards to the ground.

Uwatenage
Uwatenage (上手投げ, "overarm throw") is performed by the attacker extending their arm over the opponent's arm to grab the opponent's mawashi and throwing the opponent to the ground while turning sideways.

Yaguranage
Yaguranage (櫓投げ, "inner thigh throw") is a technique performed by, with both wrestlers grasping each other's mawashi, pushing one's leg up under the opponent's groin, lifting them off the surface and then throwing them down on their side (inner thigh throw).

Twist Down
Twist Down techniques are kimarite where the rikishi wins the match by throwing an opponent or causing them to fall through a twisting motion.

Amiuchi
Amiuchi (網打ち, "the fisherman's throw") is a throw with both arms pulling on the opponent's arm, causing the opponent to fall over forward. It is so named because it resembles the traditional Japanese technique for casting fishing nets.

Gasshōhineri
Gasshōhineri (合掌捻り, "clasped hand twist down") is performed with both hands clasped around the opponent's back, twisting the opponent over sideways. See Tokkurinage.

Harimanage
Harimanage (波離間投げ, "backward belt throw") is achieved when, reaching over the opponent's back and grabbing hold of their mawashi, the opponent is pulled over in front or beside the attacker.

Kainahineri
Kainahineri (腕捻り, "two-handed arm twist down") is performed by wrapping both arms around the opponent's extended arm and forcing him down to the dohyō by way of one's shoulder. (Similar to the tottari, but the body is positioned differently)

Katasukashi
Katasukashi (肩透かし, "under-shoulder swing down") is a technique where the attacker wraps his hands around the opponent's arm, both grasping the opponent's shoulder and forcing him down.

Kotehineri
Kotehineri (小手捻り, "arm lock twist down") is called when twisting the opponent's arm down, causing a fall.

Kubihineri
Kubihineri (首捻り, "head twisting throw") is performed by twisting the opponent's head or neck down, causing a fall.

Makiotoshi
Makiotoshi (巻き落とし, "twist down") is achieved when, reacting quickly to an opponent's actions, twisting the opponent's off-balance body down to the dohyō without grasping the mawashi.

Ōsakate
Ōsakate (大逆手, "backward twisting overarm throw") is a kimarite in which the attacker takes the opponent's arm extended over one's arm and twists the arm downward, while grabbing the opponent's body and throwing it in the same direction as the arm.

Sabaori
Sabaori (鯖折り, "forward force down") is performed by grabbing the opponent's mawashi while pulling out and down, forcing the opponent's knees to the dohyō.

Sakatottari
Sakatottari (逆とったり, "arm bar throw counter") is to wrap one arm around the opponent's extended arm while grasping onto the opponent's wrist with the other hand, twisting and forcing the opponent down (could be considered an "anti-tottari").

Shitatehineri
Shitatehineri (下手捻り, "twisting underarm throw") is a kimarite where a rikishi extends an arm under the opponent's arm to grasp the mawashi, then pulling the mawashi down until the opponent falls or touches his knee to the dohyō.

Sotomusō
Sotomusō (外無双, "outer thigh propping twist down") is a technique using the left (right) hand to grab onto the outside of the opponent's right (left) knee and twisting the opponent over one's left (right) knee.

Tokkurinage
Tokkurinage (徳利投げ, "two handed head twist down") is executed by grasping the opponent's neck or head with both hands and twisting him down to the dohyō.

Tottari
Tottari (とったり, "arm bar throw") is performed by wrapping both arms around the opponent's extended arm and forcing him forward down to the dohyō.

Tsukiotoshi

Tsukiotoshi (突き落とし, "thrust down") is achieved through twisting the opponent down to the dohyō by forcing the arms on the opponent's upper torso, off of his center of gravity.

Uchimusō
Uchimusō (内無双, "inner thigh propping twist down") is a technique using the left (right) hand to grab onto the outside of the opponent's left (right) knee and twisting the opponent down.

Uwatehineri
Uwatehineri (上手捻り, "twisting overarm throw") is performed by extending the arm over the opponent's arm to grasp the mawashi, then pulling the mawashi down until the opponent falls or touches his knee to the dohyō.

Zubuneri
Zubuneri (ずぶねり, "head pivot throw") is called when the head is used to thrust an opponent down during a hineri.

Backwards Body Drop
Backwards body drop techniques are kimarite where the rikishi wins the match by throwing an opponent or forcing them backwards.

Izori
Izori (居反り, "backwards body drop") is a technique where, diving under the charge of the opponent, the attacker grabs behind one or both of the opponent's knees, or their mawashi and pulls them up and over backwards.

Kakezori
Kakezori (掛け反り, "hooking backwards body drop") is performed by putting one's head under the opponent's extended arm and body, and forcing the opponent backwards over one's legs.

Shumokuzori
Shumokuzori (撞木反り, "bell hammer drop") is a technique carried out in the same position as a tasukizori, but the wrestler throws himself backwards, thus ensuring that his opponent lands first under him. The name is derived from the similarity to the shape of Japanese bell hammers.

Sototasukizori

Sototasukizori (外たすき反り, "outer reverse backwards body drop") is a technique which, with one arm around the opponents arm and one arm around the opponents leg, one lifts their opponent and throws him sideways and backwards.

Tasukizori
Tasukizori (たすき反り, "kimono-string drop") is performed with one arm around the opponents arm and one arm around the opponents leg, lifting the opponent perpendicular across the shoulders and throwing him down. The name refers to tasuki, the cords used to tie the sleeves of the traditional Japanese kimono.

Tsutaezori
Tsutaezori (伝え反り, "underarm forward body drop") is executed by shifting the extended opponent's arm around and twisting the opponent behind one's back and down to the dohyō.

Special Techniques
Special techniques are kimarite where the rikishi wins the match by techniques outside the above categories.

Hatakikomi

Hatakikomi (叩き込み, "slap down") is slapping down the opponent's shoulder, back, or arm and forcing them to fall forwards touching the clay.

Hikiotoshi
Hikiotoshi (引き落とし, "hand pull down") is pulling on the opponent's shoulder, arm, or mawashi and forcing them to fall forwards touching the clay.

Hikkake
Hikkake (引っ掛け, "arm grabbing force out") is a technique in which, while moving backwards to the side, the opponent is pulled past the attacker and out of the dohyō by grabbing and pulling their arm with both hands.

Kimedashi
Kimedashi (極め出し, "arm barring force out") is performed by immobilizing the opponent's arms and shoulders with one's arms and forcing him out of the dohyō.

Kimetaoshi
Kimetaoshi (極め倒し, "arm barring force down") is a technique executed by immobilizing the opponent's arms and shoulders with one's arms and forcing him down.

Okuridashi
Okuridashi (送り出し, "rear push out") is a kimarite in which one pushes an off-balance opponent out of the dohyō from behind.

Okurigake
Okurigake (送り掛け, "rear leg trip") is to trip an opponent's ankle up from behind.

Okurihikiotoshi
Okurihikiotoshi (送り引き落とし) is a technique where a rikishi pulls an opponent down from behind.

Okurinage
Okurinage (送り投げ, "rear throw down") is to throw an opponent from behind.

Okuritaoshi
Okuritaoshi (送り倒し, "rear push down") is achieved by knocking down an opponent from behind.

Okuritsuridashi
Okuritsuridashi (送り吊り出し, "rear lift out") occurs when one picks up the opponent by his mawashi from behind and throws him out of the dohyō.

Okuritsuriotoshi
Okuritsuriotoshi (送り吊り落とし, "rear lifting body slam") is performed when a rikishi picks up an opponent by his mawashi from behind and throw him down on the dohyō.

Sokubiotoshi
Sokubiotoshi (素首落とし, "head chop down") is achieved by pushing the opponent's head down from the back of the neck.

Tsuridashi

Tsuridashi (吊り出し, "lift out") is a technique in which, while wrestlers face each other, one picks up their opponent by his mawashi and delivers him outside of the dohyō.

Tsuriotoshi
Tsuriotoshi (吊り落とし, "lifting body slam") is, while wrestlers face each other, to pick up the opponent by his mawashi and slam him onto the dohyō.

Ushiromotare
Ushiromotare (後ろもたれ, "backward lean out") is called when, while the opponent is behind the rikishi, to back up and push him out of the dohyō.

Utchari
Utchari (うっちゃり, "backward pivot throw") is a technique where, when near the edge of the dohyō, a rikishi bends himself backwards and twists the opponent's body until he steps out of the dohyō.

Waridashi
Waridashi (割り出し, "upper-arm force out") is to push one foot of the opponent out of the ring from the side, extending the arm across the opponent's body and using the leg to force him off balance.

Yobimodoshi
Yobimodoshi (呼び戻し, "pulling body slam") is achieved when, reacting to the opponent's reaction to an attacker's inside pull, the attacker pulls them off by grabbing around them around the waist, before throwing them down.

Non-techniques
Non-techniques are the five ways in which a wrestler can win without employing a technique.

Fumidashi
Fumidashi (踏み出し, "rear step out") occurs when an opponent accidentally takes a backward step outside the ring with no attack initiated against him.

Isamiashi
Isamiashi (勇み足, "forward step out") occurs when, in the performance of a kimarite, the opponent inadvertently steps too far forward and places a foot outside the ring.

Koshikudake
Koshikudake (腰砕け, "inadvertent collapse") is called when the opponent falls over backwards without a technique being initiated against him. This usually happens because he has over-committed to an attack.

Tsukihiza
Tsukihiza (つきひざ, "knee touch down") is called when the opponent stumbles and lands on one or both knees without any significant prior contact with the winning wrestler.

Tsukite
Tsukite (つき手, "hand touch down") occurs when the opponent stumbles and lands on one or both hands without any significant prior contact with the winning wrestler.

Others
Databases for sumo bouts, such as Sumo Reference, may list other win conditions alongside the current 87 kimarite for statistical and historical purposes.

Fusen
Fusen (不戦) is called when the opponent is absent for the scheduled bout (by default). Wins and losses by fusen are also visually recorded as black and white squares rather than the normal black and white circles.

Hansoku
Hansoku (反則, infraction) are called when the opponent is disqualified.

Archaic kimarite and draws
The Japan Sumo Association did not attempt to start standardizing kimarite decisions until 1935 and has modified its official list several times since. As a result, databases containing sumo results from earlier periods may list kimarite that are no longer recognized. 

Similar to fusen, the various draw states were recorded visually in a different manner than normal victories and loses, employing white triangles for both wrestlers instead.

See also
 Glossary of sumo terms

References

External links
 Kimarite information in English
 The Techniques of Sumo (NHK world)

Sumo terminology